The right of redemption, in the law of real property, is the right of a debtor whose real property has been foreclosed upon and sold to reclaim that property if they are able to come up with the money to repay the amount of the debt. Most U.S. states have a statutory provision that allows such a reclamation of property.

See also
Equity of redemption

Property law
Foreclosure